The Shawnee Open is a golf tournament that was first held in 1912.  It is played at The Shawnee Inn & Golf Resort in Smithfield Township, Monroe County, Pennsylvania.  The couse was completed in 1911, the first ever design by renowned architect A. W. Tillinghast. The Shawnee Open was recognized as a PGA Tour event from 1916 to 1937.  While no longer recognized as a PGA Tour event, there have been more than 60 Shawnee Opens played. It is still held annually, and is now sponsored by the Philadelphia section of the PGA of America.

In 1938, Shawnee hosted the PGA Championship and the Shawnee touring professional, Sam Snead, lost to Paul Runyan 8 and 7. According to legend, Tommy Armour hit 10 straight balls out of bounds and scored the first ever "Archaeopteryx" (15 or more over-par) when he made a 23 on a par-5, for 18-over-par at the 1927 Shawnee Open. Many sources still claim that this represents the highest score on one hole in PGA history. However, other research shows that he carded "only" an 11 on the 17th hole in the third round.

Winners 
Philadelphia Section of PGA of America event

2018 Brian Bergstol
2017 Brett Melton
2016 Michael Little
2015 Josh Rackley
2014 Mark Sheftic
2013 John Pillar
2012 Greg Farrow
2011 No tournament (weather)
2010 Don Allan
2009 Travis Deibert
2008 John Pillar
2007 Stu Ingraham
2006 No tournament (bridge washed out)
2005 Barry Dear
2004 Dave McNabb
2003 Mark Parisi
2002 Rich Steinmetz
2001 Greg Farrow
2000 Chris Anderson
1999 Pete Oakley
1998 Pete Oakley
1990–97 No tournament
1989 Wayne Phillips
1988 Harold Perry
1987 Gene Fieger
1986 Pete Oakley
1985 Wayne Phillips
1984 Pete Oakley
1983 Pete Oakley
1982 Dennis Milne
1981 John Kulhamer
1980 Pete Oakley
1979 Jack Connelly
1965–78 No tournament
1964 William Petersen
1963 No tournament
1962 Howard Everitt
1961 Raymond Lebel
1960 Raymond Lebel
1959 Leon Buck
1958 W.C. Wehnes
1957 F.A. Winchenbach
1956 Howard Everitt
1955 Howard Everitt
1954 Howard Everitt
1953 Ellis Taylor
1952 Olin Cerrochi
1951 Tom Robins
1950 Ed Meister
1949 Ed Meister
1939–48 No tournament
1938 Robert Weichel

PGA Tour

1937 Lawson Little
1936 Ed Dudley
1931–35 No tournament
1930 Ed Dudley
1929 Harry Cooper
1928 Willie Macfarlane
1927 Johnny Farrell
1926 Johnny Farrell
1925 Willie Macfarlane
1924 Leo Diegel
1923 George McLean
1922 Johnny Farrell
1921 Willie Ogg
1920 Jim Barnes
1919 Jim Barnes
1918 No tournament
1917 Eddie Loos
1916 Walter Hagen

pre-PGA Tour
1915 Gilbert Nicholls
1914 Isaac Mackie
1913 John McDermott
1912 Fred McLeod

References

External links 
PGA of America - Philadelphia section
Past champions

Former PGA Tour events
Golf in Pennsylvania
PGA of America sectional tournaments